Michael Keenan may refer to:
Michael Keenan (politician) (born 1972), member of the Australian House of Representatives 2004–2019
Michael Keenan (actor) (1939–2020), American actor and academic
Mike Keenan, Canadian hockey coach
Mickey Keenan, Northern Irish football goalkeeper